is a railway station in the city of Kashiwazaki, Niigata, Japan, operated by East Japan Railway Company (JR East).

Lines
Higashi-Kashiwazaki Station is served by the Echigo Line and is 1.6 kilometers from the terminus of the line at Kashiwazaki Station.

Station layout
The station consists of a two opposed ground-level side platforms connected by a footbridge; however, only one platform is in use, and serves one bi-directional track.

The station is unattended. Suica farecard cannot be used at this station.

History
It was renamed to its present name on 1 October 1969. With the privatization of Japanese National Railways (JNR) on 1 April 1987, the station came under the control of JR East.

Surrounding area
Kashiwazaki Tokiwa High School

See also
 List of railway stations in Japan

References

External links

 JR East station information 

Railway stations in Niigata Prefecture
Railway stations in Japan opened in 1912
Echigo Line
Stations of East Japan Railway Company
Kashiwazaki, Niigata